Allulu (also Romanized as ‘Allūlū; also known as ‘Alalūlū) is a village in Abish Ahmad Rural District, Abish Ahmad District, Kaleybar County, East Azerbaijan Province, Iran. At the 2006 census, its population was 516, in 96 families.

References 

Populated places in Kaleybar County